Oymaklı is a Turkish place name that may refer to the following places in Turkey:

 Oymaklı, Gerger, a village in the district of Gerger, Adıyaman Province
 Oymaklı, Karataş, a village in the district of Karataş, Adana Province